Yue Xin is the name of:

Yue Xin (footballer) (born 1995), Chinese association footballer
Yue Xin (activist) (born 1990s), Chinese feminist and student-activist

See also
Yuexin Township (岳新乡), a township in Anyue County, Sichuan, China
Xin Yue (disambiguation)